The 4 × 100 metres relay at the Summer Olympics is the shortest track relay event held at the multi-sport event. The men's relay has been present on the Olympic athletics programme since 1912 and the women's event has been continuously held since the 1928 Olympic Games in Amsterdam. It is the most prestigious 4×100 m relay race at elite level.

The competition has two parts: a first round and an eight-team final. Historically, there has been a semi-final round, but this has been eliminated as selection is now determined by time – the sixteen fastest nations during a pre-Olympic qualification period are entered. Since 1988, teams may enter up to six athletes for the event. Larger nations typically have two reserves runners in the first round in order to preserve the fitness of their top runners for the final. Heat runners of medal-winning teams receive medals even if they did not run in the final.

The Olympic records for the event were both set at the 2012 Olympic Games in London: the Jamaican men's team ran 36.84 seconds and the American women's team won with 40.82 seconds, both of them world records. The men's world record has been broken and equalled at the Olympics on numerous occasions. The record was set at six consecutive editions from 1912 to 1936, then five straight editions from 1956 to 1972. Since then, the men's Olympic final has been won in a world record time in 1984, 1992, and 2012. The women's world record has been similarly linked to the Olympics: the record was broken on the first three occasions it was contested as an Olympic event (1928 to 1936). It was then improved at six successive Olympics from 1952 to 1972. The women's world record at the 2012 Olympic Games ended the forty-year absence of such a feat.

The United States is by far the most dominant nation in the event. The country has won the men's race 15 times and the women's race on 11 occasions. The American men accrued eight straight wins from 1920 to 1956 and have won a medal in the event at all but eight Olympics (boycott in 1980, baton pass failures in 1912, 1960, 1988, 2008, 2016 and 2020, and their disqualification after the race due to Tyson Gay's doping charge in 2012). The American women took four consecutive gold medals from 1984 to 1996. As of 2016, no other country has won more than three golds in the men's or women's event. Jamaica (four wins, nine medals), Great Britain (two wins, fifteen medals) and the Soviet Union (two wins, eleven medals) are the next most successful nations.

Participants in this event are often competitors in the 100 metres and 200 metres individual Olympic events (and, less commonly, the sprint hurdles). Frank Wykoff and Evelyn Ashford are the most successful athletes in the event, having each won three gold medals. In terms of total career medals, the most successful is Jamaica's Veronica Campbell-Brown with four (one gold and three silvers). Only two other athletes have won three medals in the event: Marlies Göhr (twice champion) and Lyudmila Zharkova.

Medal summary

Men

Multiple medalists

Medals by country

 The German total includes teams both competing as Germany and the United Team of Germany, but not East or West Germany.

Women

Multiple medalists

Medals by country

 The German total includes teams both competing as Germany and the Unified Team of Germany, but not East or West Germany.

Finishing times

Top ten fastest Olympic times

References
Participation and athlete data
Athletics Men's 4 × 100 metres Relay Medalists. Sports Reference. Retrieved on 2014-02-07.
Athletics Women's 4 × 100 metres Relay Medalists. Sports Reference. Retrieved on 2014-02-07.
Olympic record progressions
Mallon, Bill (2012). TRACK & FIELD ATHLETICS - OLYMPIC RECORD PROGRESSIONS. Track and Field News. Retrieved on 2014-02-07.
Specific

External links
IAAF 4×100 metres relay homepage
Official Olympics website
Olympic athletics records from Track & Field News

100
Olympics
Relay 4x100 metres